English is an unincorporated community located at County Road 42 and Oyster Creek in northern Brazoria County, Texas, United States. It is located within the Greater Houston metropolitan area.

History
The community may have been named after the family of an area resident named "Buck" English. In 1917, English had a general store and a cotton gin. In 1921, a post office opened in English, closing in 1924 with its functions transferring to the office in Sandy Point. Area maps from the 1980s show several scattered residences and abandoned buildings.

Geography

Education
Today, the community is served by the Angleton Independent School District. Children in the area attend Frontier Elementary School, Angleton Junior High School, and Angleton High School in Angleton.

Gallery

References

Unincorporated communities in Texas
Unincorporated communities in Brazoria County, Texas